Jean Tschabold (25 December 1925 – 29 April 2012) was a Swiss gymnast. He competed in eight events at the 1952 Summer Olympics winning a silver medal in the team all-round event.

References

1925 births
2012 deaths
Swiss male artistic gymnasts
Olympic gymnasts of Switzerland
Gymnasts at the 1952 Summer Olympics
Olympic silver medalists for Switzerland
Olympic medalists in gymnastics
Medalists at the 1952 Summer Olympics
20th-century Swiss people